Qal'ai Mirzoboy is a village in Sughd Region, northern Tajikistan. It is part of the jamoat Vahdat in Devashtich District.

Notes

References

Populated places in Sughd Region